The 2012 West Lothian Council election took place on 3 May 2012 to elect members of West Lothian Council. The election will use the 9 wards created as a result of the Local Governance (Scotland) Act 2004, with each ward electing three or four Councillors using the single transferable vote system form of proportional representation, with 33 Councillors being elected. The Bathgate Ward gained an additional seat for the 2012 elections. The election saw Labour remain the largest party on the Council as they gained 2 seats. The Scottish National Party also made 2 net gains and significantly increased their vote share, outpolling Labour in terms of votes cast. The Scottish Conservative and Unionist Party retained their single seat on the Council and so to did the Independents. The Action to Save St. John's Hospital group were completely wiped out from the authority losing all of their 3 seats.

Following the election the Labour formed a minority administration with the support of the Conservative and Independent Councillors. This replaced the SNP minority administration which had been supported by the Conservative and Action to Save St. John's Hospital group Councillors from 2007-2012.

Election result

 

Note: Bathgate ward is represented by four councillors, rather than three from 2012. "Votes" are the first preference votes. The net gain/loss and percentage changes relate to the result of the previous Scottish local elections on 3 May 2007. This may differ from other published sources showing gain/loss relative to seats held at dissolution of Scotland's councils.

Ward results

Linlithgow
2007: 1xCon; 1xSNP; 1xLab
2012: 1xCon; 1xSNP; 1xLab
2007-2012 Change: No change

Broxburn, Uphall and Winchburgh 
2007: 2xLab; 1xSNP; 1xASSH
2012: 2xLab; 2xSNP
2007-2012 Change: SNP gain one seat from ASSH

Livingston North
2007: 2xSNP; 1xLab; 1xASSH
2012: 2xSNP; 2xLab
2007-2012 Change: Lab gain one seat from ASSH

Livingston South
2007: 2xLab; 2xSNP
2012: 2xLab; 2xSNP
2007-2012 Change: No change

East Livingston and East Calder
2007: 2xLab; 2xSNP
2012: 2xLab; 2xSNP
2007-2012 Change: No change

Fauldhouse and the Briech Valley
2007: 2xLab; 1xSNP
2012: 2xLab; 1xSNP
2007-2012 Change: No change

Whitburn and Blackburn
2007: 2xLab; 1xSNP; 1xASSH
2012: 2xLab; 2xSNP
2007-2012 Change: SNP gain one seat from ASSH

Bathgate
2007: 2xSNP; 1xLab
2012: 2xLab; 2xSNP
2007-2012 Change: No change Lab gain extra seat

Armadale and Blackridge
2007: 1xIndependent; 1xLab; 1xSNP
2012: 1xIndependent; 1xSNP; 1xLab
2007-2012 Change: No change

Post-election Changes
† Armadale and Blackridge SNP Cllr Isabel Hutton was disqualified for non-attendance on 16 February 2015. The by-election was held on 26 March 2015 and the seat was won by the SNP's Sarah King.
†† Linlithgow SNP Cllr Martyn Day was elected MP for Linlithgow and East Falkirk on 7 May 2015. He resigned his Council seat in July 2015 and a by-election was held on 1 October 2015 and the seat was held by the party's David Tait.

By Elections since 2012

References

External links
Full results for the 2012 council election

2012
2012 Scottish local elections